Aleksandar Mitushev (born 20 November 1989) is a Bulgarian football defender who currently plays for Belasitsa Petrich.

Career
Mitushev began his professional career with PFC Belasitsa Petrich, debuting in the Bulgarian first division at the age of 17. In the wake of Belasitsa's relegation after the 2008–09 season, his contract was dissolved after arbitration with the Bulgarian Football Union. He immediately joined second division side FC Bansko in hopes of achieving a return to the first division with the club. However, Bansko released Mitushev from his contract in January 2010.

References

External links
 

1989 births
Living people
Bulgarian footballers
PFC Belasitsa Petrich players
FC Bansko players
First Professional Football League (Bulgaria) players
Association football defenders